Christopher Riffe (1764-1850) accompanied Col. William Casey (great-grandfather of Mark Twain) to Kentucky in 1784. Riffe lived at Bryan's Station, Boonesborough, Logan's Station and Carpenter's Station. He bought  of land from the grandfather of Abraham Lincoln. Riffe became the first white settler of Casey County in 1793. He was the first State Representative from Casey County, serving seven terms. He fought in the Battle of the Thames (in which Tecumseh was killed) in the Kentucky Sixth Regiment. He was Lieutenant-General of the Kentucky State Militia.

Sources
Kentucky Historical Marker No. 250 located at Middleburg Cemetery, Lynn St., Middleburg, Ky

1764 births
1850 deaths
People from Casey County, Kentucky
Members of the Kentucky House of Representatives